Trực Ninh is a rural district of Nam Định province in the Red River Delta region of Vietnam. As of 2003, the district had a population of 196,765. The district covers an area of 143 km². The district capital lies at Cổ Lễ.

References

Districts of Nam Định province